Bengt Gunnar Henrik Ohlsson (born 6 September 1963 in Östersund) is a Swedish author. He won the August Prize in 2004 for the novel Gregorius.

Selected bibliography
Gregorius (2004)

References

21st-century Swedish novelists
August Prize winners
1963 births
Living people
Swedish male novelists